The Demchok sector is a disputed area named after the villages of Demchok in Ladakh and Demchok in Tibet, situated near the confluence of the Charding Nullah and Indus River. It is a part of the greater Sino-Indian border dispute between China and India. Both China and India claim the disputed region, with a Line of Actual Control between the two nations situated along the Charding Nullah.

The Charding Nullah was mentioned by the name "Lhari stream" in a treaty between the Kingdom of Ladakh and the Ganden Phodrang government of Tibet in 1684 and stated as the boundary between the two regions. British surveys placed the border in 1847 between the princely state of Jammu and Kashmir and Qing Tibet on the stream, while British maps from 1868 onwards placed the border downstream and west of Demchok. After independence in 1947, India claimed the southern watershed of the river (roughly 3 miles southeast of Demchok) as its boundary, which has been contested by the People's Republic of China whose claims coincide with the British maps. The two countries fought a brief war in 1962, after which the Demchok region has remained divided between the two nations across a Line of Actual Control.

Geography

At the bottom of the valley, the Charding Nullah branches into a 2 km-wide delta as it joins the Indus River. During the British colonial period, there was a village on both the sides of the delta, going by the name Demchok. The southern village appears to have been the main one, frequently referred to by travellers. The Chinese spell the name of the village as Dêmqog. Travel writer Romesh Bhattacharji stated in 2012 that they expected to set up a trading village, but India never renewed trade after the war. He stated that the southern Dêmqog village has only commercial buildings whereas the northern village has security-related buildings. Both the Indians and the Chinese have track roads going up the valley on the two sides of the Charding Nullah, reaching up to the Charding–Nilung Nullah Junction (CNNJ). Occasional stand-offs between the two forces at CNNJ are reported in the newspapers.

The watershed east of the Koyul Lungpa river, near the village of Koyul, is at the western boundary of the disputed sector, with China's claim line running along the crest of the ridge.

Modern Chinese sources refer to the disputed area around Demchok as Parigas or the Parigas region. It is apparently named after the Tibetan name Palicasi of an insignificant camping site that is known to Ladakhis as Silungle.

History

Early history 
The Demchok region was mentioned as being part of the modern kingdom of Ladakh, when it was founded in the 10th century under the name Maryul. King Nyimagon, who founded the West Tibetan kingdom of Ngari Khorsum, divided his kingdom among his three sons upon his death. The eldest son Palgyigon, who is believed to have been the organiser of the Ladakh part of the kingdom, received Ladakh, and the other two sons received Guge–Purang and Zanskar. The description of Maryul in the Ladakh Chronicles mentions Demchok Karpo, the pyramidal white peak behind the Ladakhi Demchok village as one of the landmarks, possibly on its frontier. Other neighbouring landmarks like the Imis Pass ("Yimig rock") and an unidentified place called Raba Dmarpo were also mentioned.

In addition to modern Ladakh, Rudok was also part of Maryul at the time of its formation. Whether it remained affiliated to Ladakh in later times is not unknown, but during the reigns of Tsewang Namgyal and Sengge Namgyal, all the regions of Ngari Khorsum are known to have paid tribute to Ladakh. He also built the present monasteries of Hemis and Hanle, and the sacred site of Demchok was apparently been placed under the former's jurisdiction.

Treaty of Tingmosgang (1684) 

The Ladakh Chronicles (La-dvags-rgyal-rabs) mention that, at the conclusion of the Tibet–Ladakh–Mughal War in 1684, Tibet and Ladakh agreed on the Treaty of Tingmosgang, by which the extensive territories in West Tibet (Ngari) previously controlled by Ladakh were removed from its control and the frontier was fixed at the "Lha-ri stream at Demchok". The original text of the Treaty of Tingmosgang is not available to us.
The traditional border between the two regions prior to these conflicts is not clearly known.

According to Alexander Cunningham, "A large stone was then set up as a permanent boundary between the two countries, the line of demarcation drawn from the village of Dechhog [Demchok] to the hill of Karbonas [unidentified]."

Roughly 160 years after the Treaty of Tingmosgang, Ladakh came under the rule of the Dogras, who launched an invasion into the West Tibet leading to the Dogra–Tibetan War. The war ended in a stalemate. The resulting Treaty of Chushul in 1842 bound the parties to the "old, established frontiers".

British boundary commission (1846–1847) 

After the Dogras joined the British suzerainty as the state of Jammu and Kashmir, the British government dispatched a boundary commission consisting of P. A. Vans Agnew and Alexander Cunningham to define the borders of the state with Tibet in 1846–1847. The Chinese government was invited to join the effort for a mutually agreed border. However the Chinese declined, stating that the frontier was well-known and it did not need a new definition. The British boundary commission nevertheless surveyed the area. Its report stated:

The "rivulet" is evidently the Charding nullah. The Tibetan frontier guards prohibited the commission from proceeding beyond the rivulet. The commission placed the border on the Indus at Demchok, and followed the mountain watershed of the Indus river on its east, passing through the Jara La and Chang La passes. This appears to be the first time that the watershed principle was used in the Indian subcontinent for defining a boundary.

Kashmir Atlas (1868) 

Between 1847 and November 1864, the British Indian government conducted the Kashmir Survey (Survey of Kashmir, Ladak, and Baltistan or Little Tibet), whose results were published in a reduced form in the Kashmir Atlas of 1868 by the Great Trigonometrical Survey of India. Even though this was not an official boundary delimitation, the atlas made several adjustments to the boundary, including in the Demchok sector. Lamb states:

It is unclear who decided the altered boundary and on what grounds, given that the survey team leader T. G. Montgomerie was of the view that Demchok was in Ladakh. Indian commentators blame it on the rudimentary knowledge of the British surveyors about Ladakh — they were ignorant of past treaties as well as revenue records, and mistook pasture disputes as boundary disputes. In contrast, Lamb interprets this as a "compromise" wherein the British gave up territory in Demchok to include other territory near the Spanggur Lake.

Later colonial period (1868–1947)
Subsequent to the Kashmir Atlas of 1868, there was a flood of British publications on Ladakh. Despite this, no revisions were made to the border at Demchok. According to Lamb, the majority of British maps published between 1918 and 1947 reproduced the Kashmir Atlas, slotting Demchok within Tibet. During the two World Wars, some maps from world powers (including China) showed the same borders. 

Independent of the colonial cartography, the traditional boundaries continued to be followed on the ground. The Kashmir government disregarded the British maps and the Tibetan claims to Demchok seem to have persisted. Lamb states, "by the time of the Transfer of Power in 1947 nothing had been settled."

Modern claims

The Chinese claims also coincided with the borders used by the 1945 National Geographic and 1955 United States Army Map Service maps.

Prior to the Sino-Indian War of 1962, India had established a border post to the south of the delta (the "New Demchok post"). As the war progressed, the post was evacuated and the Chinese forces occupied it. It has also been referred to as "Lari Karpo" ("white lhari") and "Demchok Lari Karpo" in Tibetan documents.

After the 1962 Sino-Indian War, the village of Demchok was divided in two parts, with Demchok, Ladakh administered by India and Dêmqog, Tibet Autonomous Region administered by China. The split did not divide any of the resident families.

Sources vary on whether the larger sector is administered by China or India.

See also
Skakjung
Chumar
Aksai Chin

Notes

References

Bibliography 

 
 
 Indian Report: ; ; ; 
 Chinese report: ; ; ;

External links 
 Demchok Eastern Sector on OpenStreetMap (Chinese-controlled)
 Demchok Western Sector on OpenStreetMap (Indian-controlled)

Geography of Ladakh
Geography of Tibet
History of Ladakh
History of Tibet
Territorial disputes of China
Territorial disputes of India
Divided regions
China–India border
Demchok sector